This is a list of Franciscan theologians, in other words a list of Roman Catholic theological writers belonging to the Order of Friars Minor.

The intended arrangement is chronological by date of death.

Scotism and Scotists

Old Franciscan School
 Haymo of Faversham (d. 1244)
 Alexander of Hales (c.1183-1245)
 John of Rupella (d. 1245)
 St. Clare of Assisi (1194-1253)
 William of Melitora (d. 1260)
 St. Bonaventure (d. 1274)
 Hugh of Digne (d. 1285)
 Matthew of Aquasparta (d. 1289)
 John Pecham (d. 1292)
 Richard of Middleton (d. about 1300)
 St. Angela of Foligno (c. 1248–1309)

Scotism and the Later Franciscan School
 Bl. John Duns Scotus (1265-1308)
 Petrus Aureoli (1280-1322)
 Francis Mayron (1280-1327)
 Walter Burleigh (1275-1337), possibly an Augustinian
 William of Ockham (1288-1348)
 Nicholas of Lyra (c.1270-1349)
 Peter of Aquila (d. 1361)
 Robert de Finingham (d. 1460)
 Nicolas d'Orbellis (1400-1475)

Early modern period
 François Rabelais (c.1483-1553)
 Jean Benedicti
 François Feuardent (1539-1610)
 Juan Bautista
 Francis Nugent (1569-1635), Capuchin
 Pedro d'Alva y Astorga (d.1667)
 Bonaventura Baron (1610-1686)
 Gaudentius of Brescia (1612-1672), Capuchin
 Mathias Hauzeur (1589-1676)
 Francesco Lorenzo Brancati di Lauria (1612-1693), Conventual
 José de Carabantes (1628-1694), Capuchin
 Fortunatus Hueber (d. 1706)
 Martin of Cochem (1630-1712), Capuchin
 Bernard of Bologna (1701-1768), Capuchin

Modern period
 José Arlegui
 Viatora Coccaleo (d. 1793), Capuchin
 Archange de Lyon (1736-1822), Capuchin
 Albert Knoll
 Hilarius of Sexten (1839-1900)
 Gabriele Allegra (1907-1976)

References

Franciscan theologians
Lists of Roman Catholics